The UEFA European Under-18 Championship 1969 Final Tournament was held in East Germany.

Qualification

Single Match

|}

Two-legged Matches

|}

Group

Teams
The following teams entered the tournament. Eight teams qualified (Q) and eight teams entered without playing qualification matches.

 
  (Q)
 
  (host)
  (Q)
  (Q)
  (Q)
 
 
  (Q)
 
  (Q)
  (Q)
 
 
  (Q)

Group stage

Group A

Group B

Group C

Group D

Semifinals

Third place match

Final

External links
Results by RSSSF

UEFA European Under-19 Championship
1969
UEFA European Under-18 Championship
UEFA European Under-18 Championship
Football in East Germany
Sports competitions in East Germany
UEFA European Under-18 Championship